Sultan Muhammad may refer to:

People 

 Sultan Muhammad II ibn Mahmud (1128–1159), sultan of the Seljuq Empire, 1153–1159
 Prince Sultan Muhammad, governor of Derbent under Shirvanshah Keykubad I
 Sultan Muhammad Shah Tughluq, ruler of the Muslim Tughlaq dynasty, 1390–1394
 Sultan Muhammad (Badakhshan), 15th-century ruler of Badakhshan
 Sultan Muhammad (died c. 1451), Timurid ruler of Persia and Fars, c. 1447 – c. 1451
 Sultan Muhammad Jiwa Zainal Adilin I, 9th sultan of Kedah, 1472–1506
 Sultan Muhammad Thakurufaanu Al Auzam (died 1585), sultan of the Maldives, 1573–1585
 Sultan Muhammad Hassan, 10th sultan of Brunei, 1582–1598
 Sultan Muhammad Qutb Shah, ruled Golconda under the Qutb Shahi dynasty, 1611–1625
 Sultan Muhammad Kudarat (1581–1671), sultan of Maguindanao in the Philippines, 1619–1671
 Sultan Muhammad Ali (Brunei), 13th sultan of Brunei, 1660
 Sultan Muhammad Akbar (1657–1706), son of the Mughal emperor Aurangzeb
 Sultan Muhammad Jiwa Zainal Adilin II, 19th sultan of Kedah, 1710–1778
 Sultan Muhammad Shamsuddeen II, sultan of the Maldives, 1773–1774
 Sultan Muhammad Mu'iz ud-din, sultan of the Maldives, 1774–1779
 Sultan Muhammad Mueenuddeen I, sultan of the Maldives, 1798–1835
 Sultan Mohammad Khan (1795–1861), governor of Peshawar, 1828–1834
 Sultan Muhammad Imaaduddeen IV, sultan of the Maldives, 1835–1882
 Aga Sir Sultan Muhammad Shah (1877–1957), 48th Imam of the Nizari Ismaili community
 Sultan Muhammad Shamsuddeen Iskander III, CMG (1879–1945), sultan of the Maldives, 1893 and 1902–1934
 Sultan Muhammad Jamalul Alam II (1889–1924), 26th sultan of Brunei Darussalam, 1906–1924
 Sultan Muhammad Khan Golden, Pakistani car and motorcycle stuntman
 Sultan Muhammad Faris Petra (born 1969), sultan of Kelantan, Malaysia
 Sultan Muhammad Kaharuddin III (1902–1975), sultan of Sumbawa

Ottoman sultans 
 Sultan Muhammad I (1381–1421), Mehmed I, reigned 1413–1421
 Sultan Muhammad II (1432–1481), Mehmed the Conqueror, reigned 1444–1446 and 1451–1481
 Sultan Muhammad III (1566–1603), Mehmed III, reigned 1595–1603
 Sultan Muhammad IV (1642–1693), Mehmed IV, reigned 1648–1687
 Sultan Muhammad V (1844–1918), Mehmed V, reigned 1909–1918
 Sultan Muhammad VI (1861–1926), Mehmed VI, reigned 1918–1922

Places 

 Sultan Muhammad IV Stadium, stadium in Kota Bharu, Kelantan, Malaysia
 Sultan Muhammad Kaharuddin III Airport, in Sumbawa Besar, West Nusa Tenggara, Indonesia
 Sultan Muhammad Salahudin Airport, on Sumbawa Island, West Nusa Tenggara, Indonesia

Other 
 Sultan Mohammed, 16th-century artist of Persian miniatures.
 Fatih Sultan Muhammad, 1983 Turkish animated film about the fall of Constantinople to Sultan Muhammad II

See also 
 Muhammad Shah (disambiguation)
 Sultan Mahmud (disambiguation)
 Sultan Muhammad Shah (disambiguation)